Roresand or Roresanden is a village in Grimstad municipality in Agder county, Norway. The village is located on the southwestern end of the lake Rore along the Norwegian County Road 404.

The cemetery for the church is located in Roresand, right next to the Landvik school. Historically, Roresand was the administrative centre of the old municipality of Landvik which existed until 1971.

References

Villages in Agder
Grimstad